Shane Richards (born June 4, 1995) is a professional Canadian football offensive lineman for the Toronto Argonauts of the Canadian Football League (CFL).

Early playing career
Following high school, Richards played for the Calgary Colts of the Canadian Junior Football League in the 2014 season and practiced with the Calgary Stampeders as a territorial rights player that same year. He then attended New Mexico Military Institute to play college football for the Broncos in 2015. After seeing success there, he transferred to play for the Oklahoma State Cowboys in 2016 where he played in four games as a junior. He had a redshirt season in 2017 and returned to play his senior year in 2018 where he played in eight regular season games and in the Liberty Bowl victory over Missouri.

Professional career
Upon entering the CFL Draft, Richards was ranked as the second-best prospect by the Central CFL Scouting Bureau for players eligible in the 2019 CFL Draft. He was eventually drafted first overall in the draft by the Toronto Argonauts and signed with the team at a team draft party with season ticket holders on May 2, 2019 to a three-year contract. Richards was an opening day starter for the team in the 2019 season and played in his first professional game on June 22, 2019 against the Hamilton Tiger-Cats. He suffered a groin injury in practice before the second game of the season and was on the injured reserve for the next ten games. He dressed in the last seven games of the season and played eight in total for his rookie year.

Personal life
Richards was born in Kingston, Jamaica to Daniel and Opel Richards and moved to Calgary as a child where he grew up and attended Crescent Heights High School.

References

External links
 Toronto Argonauts bio

1995 births
Living people
American football offensive linemen
Canadian football offensive linemen
Canadian Junior Football League players
Black Canadian players of American football
Jamaican players of Canadian football
New Mexico Military Institute Broncos football players
Oklahoma State Cowboys football players
Players of Canadian football from Alberta
Toronto Argonauts players
Jamaican emigrants to Canada
Canadian football people from Calgary